Mitotic spindle assembly checkpoint protein MAD2A is a protein that in humans is encoded by the MAD2L1 gene.

Function 

MAD2L1 is a component of the mitotic spindle assembly checkpoint that prevents the onset of anaphase until all chromosomes are properly aligned at the metaphase plate.  MAD2L1 is related to the MAD2L2 gene located on chromosome 1.  A MAD2 pseudogene has been mapped to chromosome 14.

Interactions 

MAD2L1 has been shown to interact with:

 ADAM17, 
 BUB1B, 
 CDC20, 
 CDC27 and 
 Estrogen receptor beta, 
 MAD2L2, 
 Mad1, and
 UBD.

References

Further reading